MU is a British electropunk  Mutsumi Kanamori and  Produced by Maurice Fulton. They have released three albums: Afro Finger and Gel, Out of Breach (Manchester's Revenge), which featured the minor hit "Paris Hilton" and Mu. Their debut album received critical acclaim from Pitchfork Media. It was given the "Best New Award" when first released. In 2010, Mutsumi announced that she would go by Mutsumi rather than "Mu" and that her first album in five years was in the works. Her third, self-titled album was released digitally on 31 October 2010 with a CD release following in 2011.

References

Year of birth missing (living people)
Place of birth missing (living people)
Living people
British electronic musicians